Chanchati is a village in the Lanchkhuti Municipality of region Guria, in western Republic of Georgia with the population of 499 (2014).

See also
 Guria

References

Populated places in Lanchkhuti Municipality